Thomas Edward Bosley (October 1, 1927 – October 19, 2010) was an American actor, television personality and entertainer. Bosley is best known for portraying Howard Cunningham on the ABC sitcom Happy Days (1974-1984) for which he received a Primetime Emmy Award for Outstanding Supporting Actor in a Comedy Series nomination. He's also known for his role as Sheriff Amos Tupper in the Angela Lansbury lead CBS mystery series Murder, She Wrote (1984-1988), and as the title character in the NBC/ABC series Father Dowling Mysteries (1989-1991).

Known for his work on stage, he originated the role of Fiorello La Guardia in the Broadway musical Fiorello!, earning the 1960 Tony Award for Best Performance by a Featured Actor in a Musical. He's also known for his film appearances in Love with the Proper Stranger (1963), The World of Henry Orient (1964), Divorce American Style (1967), Yours, Mine and Ours, and The Secret War of Harry Frigg (both 1968).

Bosley made his television debut as the Knave of Hearts in the NBC adaptation of Alice in Wonderland in 1955. He gained attention as a character actor performing various roles in shows such as Naked City, Profiles in Courage The Defenders, Night Gallery, Get Smart, Bewitched, and Mission: Impossible.

Early life
Born in Chicago, Illinois, Bosley was the son of Dora (née Heyman) and Benjamin Bosley. Although well known for playing a Catholic priest and Protestant patriarchs, Bosley was actually Jewish.

He attended Lake View High School in Chicago, and served in the U.S. Navy during World War II. While attending DePaul University in Chicago in 1947, he made his stage debut in Our Town with the Canterbury Players at the Fine Arts Theatre. Bosley performed at the Woodstock Opera House in Woodstock, Illinois, in 1949 and 1950 alongside Paul Newman.

Career

Early roles and stage roles
Bosley played the Knave of Hearts in a Hallmark Hall of Fame telecast of Eva Le Gallienne's production of Alice in Wonderland in 1955. But his breakthrough stage role was New York mayor Fiorello H. La Guardia in the long-running Broadway musical Fiorello! (1959), for which he won a Tony Award.

In 1994, he originated the role of Maurice in the Broadway version of Disney's Beauty and the Beast. Bosley toured as Cap'n Andy in Harold Prince's 1994 revival of Show Boat.

Bosley's first motion picture role was in 1963, as the would-be suitor of Natalie Wood in Love with the Proper Stranger. Other films include The World of Henry Orient; Divorce American Style; Yours, Mine and Ours; Gus and the made-for-television The Triangle Factory Fire Scandal. Bosley shared a heartfelt story about his own experience with the Holocaust in the documentary film Paper Clips.

 
Among his early television appearances was in 1960 on the CBS summer replacement series, Diagnosis: Unknown, with Patrick O'Neal. In 1962, he portrayed Assistant District Attorney Ryan in the episode "The Man Who Wanted to Die" on James Whitmore's ABC legal drama The Law and Mr. Jones. Also in 1962, Bosley played Teddy opposite Tony Randall and Boris Karloff in Arsenic & Old Lace for the Hallmark Hall of Fame. About this time, he was a guest star on the NBC police sitcom, Car 54, Where Are You? He also appeared on episodes of Bonanza, Bewitched, Get Smart, The Silent Force, The Streets of San Francisco, Night Gallery, A Touch of Grace, and The Love Boat. In 1969, Bosley appeared in a comical episode of The Virginian, titled "Crime Wave in Buffalo Springs," appearing alongside fellow guest-stars James Brolin, Yvonne De Carlo, Carrie Snodgress, Gary Vinson, with Virginian regulars David Hartman and Doug McClure.

Happy Days and other film and television roles
Bosley's best-known role was the character Howard Cunningham in the sitcom Happy Days. He portrayed Sheriff Amos Tupper on Murder, She Wrote and the eponymous Father Frank Dowling on Father Dowling Mysteries. Among myriad television appearances, one notable early performance was in the "Eyes" segment of the 1969 pilot of Rod Serling's Night Gallery, directed by Steven Spielberg and starring Joan Crawford. In 1977, he appeared in the miniseries Testimony of Two Men and, in 1978, he played the role of Benjamin Franklin in the television mini-series The Bastard, a role he replayed the following year in the sequel The Rebels.

His film appearances included roles in Love with the Proper Stranger (1963), The World of Henry Orient (1964), Divorce American Style (1967), Bang Bang Kid (1967), The Secret War of Harry Frigg (1968), Yours, Mine and Ours (1968), To Find a Man (1972), Mixed Company (1974), The Night That Panicked America (1975), Gus (1976), The Triangle Factory Fire Scandal (1979), O'Hara's Wife (1982), Million Dollar Mystery (1987), and Wicked Stepmother (1989).

Bosley starred in the 2008 Hallmark Channel television movie Charlie & Me. In 2010, he appeared in The Back-up Plan and Santa Buddies, which were his final films. In 1984, he guest-hosted the "Macy's Fourth of July Fireworks Spectacular" with local newscaster Pat Harper.

Voice-over roles
Bosley was known for his unique gravelly voice, leading to a number of voice acting roles. He narrated the syndicated television documentary That's Hollywood (1976–82). He hosted The General Mills Radio Adventure Theater, a 1977 radio drama series for children. He voiced many cartoon characters, including Harry Boyle in the animated series Wait Till Your Father Gets Home. Bosley was the voice of B.A.H. Humbug in the 1978 Rankin & Bass holiday special The Stingiest Man in Town. He provided the voice of the title character in the 1980s cartoon The World of David the Gnome and the shop owner Mr. Winkle in the children's Christmas special The Tangerine Bear.

Endorsements

During the 1970s and 1980s, Bosley appeared in several commercials for Glad Sandwich and Garbage Bags. He made radio commercials for the new Saturn car company, a "different kind of car company," in 1990. Later in life, he was the television spokesman for SMC (Specialty Merchandise Corporation), a national wholesaler and drop shipper.

Bosley was a spokesman for YES Entertainment Network, Inc., a fraudulent internet firm scheme that defrauded $13 million from investors around the country in the late 1990s.

Death
Bosley died from complications of a staph infection on October 19, 2010, at a hospital in Rancho Mirage, California, near his home in Palm Springs, California. His agent, Sheryl Abrams, said Bosley had been battling lung cancer. He was survived by his wife, former actress Patricia Carr, and daughter Amy Bosley Baer, who married Matthew Baer, son of Richard Baer.

Happy Days lawsuit
On April 19, 2011, Bosley's estate and four of his Happy Days co-stars, Erin Moran, Don Most, Marion Ross, and Anson Williams, filed a $10 million breach-of-contract lawsuit against CBS, which owns the show, claiming they had not been paid for merchandising revenues owed under their contracts. The cast members claimed they had not received revenues from show-related items, including comic books, T-shirts, scrapbooks, trading cards, games, lunchboxes, dolls, toy cars, magnets, greeting cards, and DVDs where their images appear on the box covers. Under their contracts, they were supposed to be paid five percent from the net proceeds of merchandising if their sole image were used, and half that amount if they were in a group. CBS said it owed the actors $8,500 and $9,000 each, most of it from slot machine revenues, but the group said they were owed millions. The lawsuit was initiated after Ross was informed by a friend playing slots at a casino of a "Happy Days" machine on which players win the jackpot when five Marion Rosses are rolled.

In October 2011, a judge rejected the group's fraud claim, which if proved could have garnered them millions of dollars in punitive damages, above and beyond any actual damages proven. On June 5, 2012, a judge denied a motion filed by CBS to have the case thrown out, which meant it would go to trial on July 17 if the matter was not settled by then. In July 2012, the actors settled their lawsuit with CBS. Each received a payment of $65,000 and a promise by CBS to continue honoring the terms of their contracts.

Filmography and stage roles

Film

Television

Stage

References

External links

 
 
 
 
 
 

1927 births
2010 deaths
Male actors from Chicago
Jewish American military personnel
United States Navy personnel of World War II
American male musical theatre actors
American male stage actors
American male television actors
American male voice actors
Audiobook narrators
Deaths from lung cancer in California
DePaul University alumni
Infectious disease deaths in California
Jewish American male actors
Tony Award winners
United States Navy sailors
Military personnel from Illinois
American male film actors
Deaths from staphylococcal infection
21st-century American Jews